The Last Seduction II is a 1999 neo-noir film directed by Terry Marcel and starring Joan Severance.  The film is a sequel to The Last Seduction and features none of the original cast or filmmakers.

Plot
Bridget Gregory, a femme fatale hiding from the law in Spain, cons a phone-sex entrepreneur while being pursued by a relentless private investigator.

Reception 
The film has a 0% rating on Rotten Tomatoes.

Cast
Joan Severance as Bridget Gregory 
Con O'Neill as Troy Fenton 
Beth Goddard as Murphy

References

External links

1990s crime films
American erotic thriller films
Films about con artists
American independent films
American neo-noir films
1999 films
1990s English-language films
1990s American films